The Oxford University Wine Circle (OUWC), founded in 1962, was a wine society in the University of Oxford. The society organised frequent tastings and tasting dinners for its members and their guests. In the course of over six decades, the Wine Circle hosted many of the reference-point estates from the wine world. While the Wine Circle was a sociable group, the emphasis at meetings was on the wines themselves: as a former President, Tom Bromwich, noted: "It's certainly not pretentious – most people, including me, have always liked wine and just want to know more about it." Along with members of the more recently established Oxford University Wine Society and the Oxford Blind Tasting Society, members of the society often participated in blind tasting competitions. A team including members of the Wine Circle took first place in the SPIT Competition at Champagne Bollinger in April 2011. Notable former members include Jeremy Seysses of Domaine Dujac, Arabella Woodrow MW, Jasper Morris MW and Alex Hunt MW.  Until the mid-2000s, the OUWC ran the Oxford blind tasting training and oversaw team selection for the Varsity Match, and there are numerous wine professionals who discovered their love and talent for tasting wine while preparing to compete against Cambridge such as: Oz Clarke and Charles Metcalfe. The Varsity Blind Tasting Match is the oldest organised blind tasting competition in the world (created by Harry Waugh in 1953); Champagne Pol Roger UK has sponsored the Match since 1992.

The Wine Circle ceased to operate in 2016. The most recent Senior Member of the Society was Professor David Womersley.

Past guests of the Wine Circle

Past guests of the Wine Circle include: 

 Château Angélus
 Château La Conseillante
 Château Mouton-Rothschild
 Château Margaux
 Château Cos d'Estournel
 Château Palmer
 Château Lynch-Bages
 Château Clerc Milon
 Château Sociando Mallet
 Château La Mission Haut-Brion
 Château Haut-Brion
 Château Grand-Puy-Lacoste
 Château Figeac
 Château Kirwan
 Château Pontet-Canet
 Château Brane-Cantenac
 Château Smith Haut Lafitte
 Domaine de Chevalier
 Château Branaire-Ducru
 Château Cantenac-Brown
 Château Montrose
 Château d'Yquem
 Château Climens
 Château Coutet
 Château Doisy Daëne
 Domaine Dujac
 Maison Louis Jadot
 William Fèvre
 Champagne Krug
 Billecart-Salmon
 Bollinger
 Dom Perignon
 Taittinger
 Charles Heidsieck
 Pierre Péters
 Ulysse Collin
 Philipponnat
 Gosset
 Champagne Salon
 Delamotte
 Jacquesson
 Nyetimber
 Château de Beaucastel
 Château La Nerthe
 M. Chapoutier
 Domaine la Barroche
 Domaine Gangloff
 Domaine de la Janasse
 Domaine de la Solitude
 Domaine de Pegau
 Clos du Mont-Olivet
 Domaine Roger Sabon
 Domaine Clos Saint-Jean
 Domaine Noël Verset
 Jaboulet
 Delas Frères
 E. Guigal
 Chateau Montelena
 Peter Michael
 Opus One Winery
 Ridge Vineyards
 Rajat Parr
 Staglin Family Vineyards
 Schrader Cellars
 Vérité
 Harlan Estate
 Shafer Vineyards
 Spottswoode
 Paul Hobbs
 Andrew Will
 Domaine Huet l’Echannsone
 Ernst Loosen
 Weingut Joh. Jos. Prüm
 Weingut Egon Müller
 Domaines Hugel
 Domaine Trimbach
 Domaine Zind-Humbrecht
 Domaine Weinbach
 Weingut Emmerich Knoll
 Weingut F.X. Pichler
 Schloss Gobelsburg
 Weinlaubenhof Kracher
 Roberto Voerzio
 Commendatore G. B. Burlotto
 Domenico Clerico
 Produttori Del Barbaresco
 Tenuta San Guido
 Tenuta di Trinoro
 Tenuta Col d’Orcia
 Castello del Terrico
 Marchesi Antinori
 Frank Cornelissen
 Vega Sicilia
 Alvaro Palacios
 Descendientes de J Palacios
 Clos Mogador
 Portal del Priorat
 Bodegas Hidalgo
 Fonseca
 Taylor
 Graham
 Disznókő
 Giaconda
 Torbreck

References

External links
 The official website of the Oxford Wine Circle
 Cambridge University Wine Society

Organizations established in 1962
Clubs and societies of the University of Oxford
Wine tasting
1962 establishments in England